

The Comte AC-11-V was a 1930s Swiss three-seat cabin monoplane produced by Flugzeugbau A. Comte for aerial photography and mapping.  The AC-11-V was a high-wing monoplane with a taikskid-conventional landing gear and powered by a  Armstrong Siddeley Lynx radial engine.

Design and development
The enclosed cabin had side-by-side seating for a pilot and co-pilot (or mapping photography specialist). To allow easy access to the cabin the starboard seat folded to one side. Another moveable seat was mounted on rails running the whole length of the cabin; it could be locked in any position on the rails giving access to the side windows. A window was fitted between the pilots' seats to allow drift readings to be made and a further floor window aft allowed a vertical camera to be used.

Operational history
During the Second World War years one aircraft was used by the Swiss Air Force to make detailed maps of Switzerland.

Specifications

References

Notes

Bibliography

See also

1930s Swiss civil utility aircraft
AC-11